Studio One was a recording studio located in Doraville, Georgia, a suburban hamlet northeast of Atlanta. The address was 3864 Oakcliff Industrial Court, Doraville GA 30340.  It is now occupied by a non related business and used as a warehouse.

The studio was designed and constructed in 1970 by audio engineer Rodney Mills, with the support of music publisher Bill Lowery and future Atlanta Rhythm Section manager Buddy Buie. Lowery and Buie, along with the latter's songwriting partner J. R. Cobb and the Classics IV's manager Paul Cochran, were the studio's original owners. The studio output included a diverse range of recordings by Journey, Lynyrd Skynyrd, Joe South, Atlanta Rhythm Section, .38 Special and Outlaws. Singer Ronnie Hammond also started his career at the studio, originally employed as an assistant audio engineer.

Atlanta Rhythm Section was formed from session musicians used at Studio One and utilised the facilities extensively for rehearsals.

Buddy Buie continued to run Studio One until 1986 when he sold it to Georgia State University.

Albums recorded at Studio One

Atlanta Rhythm Section (1972) - Atlanta Rhythm Section
Elf (1972) - Elf (Ronnie James Dio)
(Pronounced 'Lĕh-'nérd 'Skin-'nérd) (1973) – Lynyrd Skynyrd
Back Up Against the Wall (1973) - Atlanta Rhythm Section
Third Annual Pipe Dream (1974) - Atlanta Rhythm Section
"Sweet Home Alabama" (only song recorded there for the Second Helping album) (1974) - Lynyrd Skynyrd
Nuthin' Fancy (1975) - Lynyrd Skynyrd
Dog Days (1975) - Atlanta Rhythm Section
Red Tape (1976) - Atlanta Rhythm Section
A Rock and Roll Alternative (1976) - Atlanta Rhythm Section
Moonlight Feels Right (1976) - Starbuck
Street Survivors (1977) - Lynyrd Skynyrd
Stillwater (1977) - Stillwater
Champagne Jam (1978) - Atlanta Rhythm Section
Super Jam 1 (1978) - Southern Rock All-Stars
Blackbird (1979) - Mose Jones
I Reserve the Right! (1979) - Stillwater
Rockin' into the Night (1979) - .38 Special
Play It As It Lays (1979) - Alicia Bridges
Wild-Eyed Southern Boys (1981) - .38 Special
Running Free (1981, not released until 1997) - Stillwater
Tour de Force (1983) - .38 Special
Here, There & Back (1983) - Allen Collins Band
Jamboree (1986) - Guadalcanal Diary

Notes 

In The Know (1980) - Jake Sandborn
Brace Yourself (1982) - Road Dogs

Recording studios in the United States
Doraville, Georgia